Radiolab is a radio program broadcast on public radio stations in the United States, and a podcast available internationally, both produced by WNYC. Hosted by Latif Nasser and Lulu Miller, each episode focuses on a topic of a scientific and philosophical nature, through stories, interviews, and thought experiments.

Radiolab’s broadcast edition airs as an hour-long program each week while the podcast edition releases new episodes of varying lengths on a roughly biweekly schedule. For a few years the Radiolab podcast feed featured a full-length, hour-long episode every six weeks (announced by the show's hosts as "Radiolab: The Podcast"), with two shorter pieces (known as "shorts") appearing in-between. Many of these shorter pieces would later be packaged into full-length episodes not released on the show's podcast feed, but available through Radiolabs website. In recent years, Radiolab has de-standardized its podcast format, with full-length episodes being compiled almost entirely from previously released podcast shorts. The program airs in syndication to over 450 NPR affiliates around the country.

Radiolabs first nine seasons (February 2002–April 2011) comprised five episodes each. Subsequent seasons contained between nine and ten episodes. Season 15 began airing in January 2017. In 2018 the show's seasonal and episode format became obscured when online content moved from radiolab.org to ‘wnycstudios.org’.

Before Season 1 (2002–2004) 
Before the idea for a show featuring Jad Abumrad and Robert Krulwich, which did not emerge until November 2003, Abumrad produced radio documentaries that featured himself and others. Some of this material has been re-packaged and broadcast under the Radiolab banner.

2002

2003

2004

Season 1 (2005)

Season 2 (2006)

Season 3 (2007)

Episodes during Season 3 and before Season 4 (2007–2008)

Season 4 (2008)

Episodes during Season 4 and before Season 5 (2008)

Season 5 (2008)

Episodes during Season 5 and before Season 6 (2009)

Season 6 (2009)

Episodes during Season 6 and before Season 7 (2009)

Season 7 (2010)

Episodes during Season 7 and before Season 8 (2010)

Season 8 (2010)

Episodes during Season 8 and before Season 9 (2010)

Season 9 (2010–2011)

Episodes during Season 9 and before Season 10 (2010–2011)

Season 10 (2011–2012)

Episodes during Season 10 and before Season 11 (2011–2012)

Season 11 (2012–2013)

Episodes during Season 11 and before Season 12 (2012–2013)

Season 12 (2013–2014)

Episodes during Season 12 and before Season 13 (2013–2014)

Season 13 (2014–2015)

Episodes during Season 13 and before Season 14 (2014–2015)

Season 14 (2015–2016)

Episodes during Season 14 and before Season 15 (2015–2016)

Season 15 (2017)

Episodes during Season 15 and before Season 16 (2017)

After Season 15 (2018– )

2018

2019

2020

2021

2022

References

NPR programs
Lists of radio series episodes
Lists of podcast episodes